Sir Donald Hawley  (22 May 1921 – 31 January 2008) was a British colonial lawyer, diplomat and writer.

Career
Donald Frederick Hawley was educated at Radley College. At the outbreak of World War II, about to go to university, he volunteered for the Oxford and Bucks Light Infantry but was told to continue to university: he went to New College, Oxford where he took a four-term wartime degree in law.

In 1941, he joined the Royal Artillery "without Army pay and allowances whilst specially employed" because he was with Sudanese troops in North Africa. In 1944, he joined the Sudan Political Service, then the Sudan Judiciary in 1947.

In 1951, he was formally called to the bar in England. He continued as Chief Registrar of the Sudan Judiciary and Registrar-General of Marriages until 1955 when he resigned from the Sudan service and joined the British Diplomatic Service. After two years in the Foreign Office he was posted as Political Agent to the Trucial States, based in Dubai, 1958–62, then to Cairo 1962–65 and Lagos 1965–67.

He then took a sabbatical break as a fellow of Durham University, which was cut short due to the resumption of relations with Iraq after a break following the Six-Day War. Hawley was Counsellor (Commercial) at Baghdad (second to the ambassador) 1968–71, then the first British ambassador to Oman 1971–75, assistant Under-Secretary of State at the Foreign and Commonwealth Office 1975–77, and High Commissioner to Malaysia 1977–81. He then retired from the Diplomatic Service and continued as a consultant and other activities including founder membership of the Anglo-Omani Society and the British Malaysian Society, President of the Council of Reading University 1987–94 and chairman of the Royal Society for Asian Affairs 1994–2002.

Honours
Hawley was appointed MBE in 1955, CMG in 1970, and knighted KCMG in 1978. He was awarded an honorary DLitt degree by Reading University and an honorary DCL by Durham University.

Family
In 1964, Donald Hawley married Ruth Howes; the couple had a son and three daughters, one of whom is the journalist Caroline Hawley. In retirement Sir Donald and Lady Hawley lived at Little Cheverell, Wiltshire, and he wrote a history of the village.

Lady Hawley was appointed High Sheriff of Wiltshire for the year 1998 and was appointed a Deputy Lieutenant of Wiltshire in 1999.

Publications
Judges' robes in the Sudan, Faculty of Law, University of Khartoum, 1959
Courtesies in the Trucial States, Khayats, Beirut, 1965
The Trucial States,  Allen & Unwin, London, 1970. 
Oman and its renaissance, Stacey, London, 1977. 
Manners and correct form in the Middle East, Debrett's Peerage, 1984. 
Sandtracks in the Sudan, Michael Russell, 1995. 
Courtesies in the Gulf area : a dictionary of colloquial phrase and usage, Stacey, London, 1998. 
Sudan Canterbury tales, Michael Russell, 1999. 
Desert wind and tropic storm : an autobiography, Michael Russell, 2000. 
The Emirates : witness to a metamorphosis, Michael Russell, 2007. 
Little Cheverell : the history of a Wiltshire village, Michael Russell, 2007.

References
HAWLEY, Sir Donald (Frederick), Who Was Who, A & C Black, 1920–2016 (online edition, Oxford University Press, 2014)
Sir Donald Hawley (obituary), The Telegraph, London, 11 February 2008
Sir Donald Hawley: Distinguished diplomat and writer, The Independent, London, 3 March 2008
Sir Donald Hawley: Diplomat who served in Sudan, the Middle East and Malaysia and wrote well about Arab matters, The Times, London, 15 February 2008

External links

Interview with Sir Donald Hawley, British Diplomatic Oral History Programme, Churchill College, Cambridge
Catalogue of the papers of Sir Donald Hawley KCMG, MBE, Durham University
Donald Frederick HAWLEY, Soldiers of Oxfordshire

1921 births
2008 deaths
People educated at Radley College
Alumni of New College, Oxford
Royal Artillery officers
British Army personnel of World War II
Sudan Political Service officers
Academics of Durham University
Ambassadors of the United Kingdom to Oman
High Commissioners of the United Kingdom to Malaysia
People associated with the University of Reading
British writers
Knights Commander of the Order of St Michael and St George
Members of the Order of the British Empire
Anglo-Egyptian Sudan judges
British expatriates in the United Arab Emirates
British expatriates in Egypt
British expatriates in Nigeria